This is a list of science fiction films released in the 2020s. These films include core elements of science fiction, but can cross into other genres. They have been released to a cinema audience by the commercial film industry and are widely distributed with reviews by reputable critics.

Listing

Forthcoming

See also

 List of science fiction films of the 2010s

Notes

References

Science fiction
2020s